Albert Béguin (17 July 1901 – 3 May 1957) was a Swiss academic and translator. He married the French writer Raymonde Vincent (1908–1985), winner of the Prix Femina in 1937.

See also
 Structuralism
 New Criticism

1901 births
1957 deaths
German–French translators
People from the canton of Neuchâtel
Swiss academics
Swiss literary critics
Swiss male writers
Swiss translators
Swiss writers in French
20th-century translators
20th-century male writers